Barreiro is a town in the southern part of the island of Maio, Cape Verde. It is around 5 km east of the island capital Porto Inglês. At the 2010 census, its population was 535.

See also
List of cities and towns in Cape Verde

References
 

Geography of Maio, Cape Verde
Towns in Cape Verde